In a Cave is the tenth album by the indie rock band Elf Power. It was released in 2008 on Rykodisc.

Track listing
All tracks written by Andrew Rieger, except where noted.

"Owl Cut (White Flowers in the Sky)" (Eric Harris, Andrew Rieger) - 2:24
"Spiral Stairs" - 3:40
"A Tired Army" (Harris, Rieger) - 2:28
"Paralyzed" - 3:01
"New Lord" - 4:05
"Softly Through the Void" - 3:03
"Window to Mars" (Harris, Rieger) - 1:21
"The New Mythology" - 3:51
"Fried Out" - 3:00
"The Demon's Daughter" - 3:56
"Quiver and Quake" - 3:10
"Heads of Dust, Hearts of Lust" (Harris, Rieger) - 1:45
"Midnight Crawls Out" - 3:57

References

Elf Power albums
Rykodisc albums
2008 albums